Desigual;); meaning "unequal, uneven") is a Spanish fashion label. The company was founded by Thomas Meyer in 1984, and is headquartered in Barcelona, Spain. As of 2022, it had a presence in 109 countries, with different distribution channels and several partners.

History 
In 1983, founder Thomas Meyer designed a jacket made from scraps of second-hand jeans, then known as the "Iconic Jacket". The following year, he launched the brand Desigual. The idea came from Spanish filmmaker Isabel Coixet. In 1986, the company opened its first own store in the harbor of Ibiza and included its first logo – a graphical representation of a naked man and woman holding hands – designed by Peret.In 2011, Desigual started collaborating with French designer Christian Lacroix.

In 2012, the company officially opened its headquarters in the neighborhood of La Barceloneta in Barcelona, a glass building designed by Ricardo Bofill with 24,000 square meters of floor space distributed over six stories, which required an investment of 50 million euros. Desigual then joined the Textile Exchange. In 2015, it inaugurated its logistics center in Viladecans.

In 2019, the company redefined its products, including new materials, patterns and designs, in an effort to expand its audience and incorporate new generations.

Development 
Known for a different kind of styling based on ethnic fabrics, colorful garments and creative designs, Desigual launches two collections every year: spring-summer and autumn-winter. The company has ten sales channels, both physical and online, and distribution is centralized in logistics centers located in Viladecans, Gavà, New Jersey (USA) and Hong Kong. Desigual was managed by Manel Adell from 2002 until December 2013. It achieved a 60% annual growth from 2002 to 2009, and a turnover of €250 million in 2009, €440 million in 2010 and €560 million in 2011. In 2011 it employed 2,900 people of 72 nationalities. In 2013 Manel Jadraque became the CEO. Further on, Alberto Ojinaga has been the managing director since 2016. In 2022 the firm has a presence in 109 countries, with 393 mono-brand stores and more than 2,600 employees worldwide, 547 of whom work at the Barcelona headquarters in the neighborhood of La Barceloneta.

In 2020, the company was ranked among the most valuable Spanish brands on BrandZ, and received the bronze Laus Award for the new brand identity it launched in 2019.

In 2021, Desigual introduced a four-day work week, allowing three days in the office and one day from home. The measure was approved by 86%, after being introduced at headquarters to a group of 500 employees. The work week was launched in October and was the first time an international fashion brand established such a week in Spain.

Desigual is part of Amfori and Sedex to audit and control its supply chain. The company have also signed agreements with international platforms focused on environmental responsibility like Textile Exchange, Sustainable Apparel Coalition (SAC), Better Cotton Initiative (BCI) or the Fashion Pact.

Brand image 
Some of the names of collections launched by the company are "Real Life", "Magic Stories", "Luxury Feelings", "Me&You", "Better&Better", "Wow", "All Together", "Handmade", "Rainbow", "El Love" "La Difference", "El Now", "We are Animals" and "La vida es Chula".

In 2004, the company launched a line of T-shirts inspired by drawings of Thomas Meyer's daughters. In January 2010, Desigual launched a campaign in Spain and Portugal to promote the sale period: customers were invited to enter stores in their underwear, with the first 100 customers receiving a free outfit. The slogan for this campaign was: "Enter naked, leave dressed". 200 people queued in their underwear on the street outside the Madrid store to take advantage of the winter sale. The campaign was repeated in London, Berlin, Stockholm, Madrid, Prague and New York in June 2011; and in Madrid, Seville and Lyon in January 2012.

One of the brand’s most notable campaigns starred Winnie Harlow, a Canadian model with vitiligo, who was the face of the spring-summer 2014 collection. Desigual regularly creates collections with cultural and artistic figures. In addition to the collaboration with French designer Christian Lacroix, which began in 2011. Desigual signed a worldwide partnership with Cirque du Soleil in June 2011to develop a clothing collection named "Desigual inspired by Cirque du Soleil" including sixty items of clothing and accessories. Desigual also collaborated with Disney in a collection inspired by the iconic denim jacket, created by Thomas Meyer in the 80s from denim scraps with leather embellishments of different colour.

Starting in 2018, the firm established new collaborations with well-known personalities and other companies through which it has launched capsule collections featuring new materials, campaigns promoting diversity, and artistic projects. These collaborations have involved the likes of artists Miranda Makaroff and Okuda San Miguel, designer María Escoté, actor Jordi Mollá and Najwa Nimri, as well as with Ecoalf, Victoria or Sonar Barcelona.

In June 2019, the firm launched its new brand image, which featured a new logo that flipped the brand name backwards, along with a product revamp (more urban, versatile and sustainable garments and accessories) and a more personalized shopping experience. This required a redesign of strategic stores in Europe, America and Asia. Notable among them was the Harajuku district in Tokyo, Japan, one of the company's most important markets. This store dedicated one of its floors to offering customers the opportunity to customize garments and attend workshops led by artists.

At the end of the same year, as part of the international art event Art Basel Miami Beach, Desigual presented its spring-summer 2020 collection with a fashion show, as well as an artistic show directed by Spanish artist Carlota Guerrero and inspired by the kiss. It starred personalities from the world of fashion, art, film and music, who performed a choreography, and was followed by a show where couples and trios kissed in front of the audience wearing garments from the new collection and, later on, nothing at all.

In 2020, the brand continued to roll out its revamped image and a new retail store concept based on art galleries: uncluttered spaces with fewer clothes and hangers, with the garment as the central item, to impress the customer. This new concept is expanding to flagship stores in all markets.

The 2022 fall-winter campaign was designed and carried out in black and white by photographer Mario Sorrenti and model Grace Elizabeth, who had previously modelled for Victoria’s Secret, Chanel and Fendi. The 2022 fall-winter campaign image is Nathy Peluso, the Argentine singer and songwriter, also known for her radical image, that embodies the brand's values.

Digitalization 
The transformation plan adopted in 2015 required an investment of more than 80 million euros in logistics processes, IT, innovation and the distribution network. RFID technology has been implemented across all Desigual stores, enabling the inventory to be managed accurately and in real time, while also establishing stock traceability from the source. At physical points of sale, the company uses the "Ask Me" service, allowing multiple transactions to be carried out, from exchanges or returns to making purchases. The "Ship From Store" service has also been launched, a system that allows packages to be prepared at the closest store to the delivery point.

As for the online channel, the company has its own website and sells its products through e-tailers and flash sales. Created in 1998, the desigual.com website was refreshed at the end of 2019 to align it with the new brand image, featuring advances in terms of personalization, scalability and localization. Available in more than 150 markets, the online store is supported by cross-border e-commerce technologies from logistics and technology partner Global-e. It also integrates a system of recommendations based on artificial intelligence and offers users country-specific payment methods. The COVID-19 pandemic brought about a change in consumption and purchasing habits which boosted digital channels. Since May 2020, online sales on desigual.com have recorded an average growth of 50%, with peaks of up to 70%. 

Desigual's use of blockchain technology to improve visibility in the supply chain has been noted as an "important step" towards building in more transparency and accountability into the process of meeting customer needs.

Innovation 
In 2021, Desigual created Awesome Lab, a startup accelerator to drive tech innovation in the fashion sector and provide solutions to the industry's main challenges. This was a pioneering initiative in the fashion business in Spain.

In its first call, it was developed with the Plug and Play open innovation platform. Seven companies were chosen from more than 150: Vestico, Syrup Tech, Swearit, Personify XP, Resortecs, Exonode and SXD, with ideas around blockchain, artificial intelligence, new materials and machine learning. The second call, in 2022, is being carried out with Wayra, Telefónica's open innovation hub.

Sustainable production 
Desigual's clothing is mainly manufactured in Asia (73% of production), primarily in countries such as China and India. Some is also manufactured in Europe and the Middle East (27% of production). In 2020 the company made public the list of garment factories actively working for it around the world (Tier 1 suppliers).

To ensure compliance with the company's Code of Conduct for suppliers (including regulations on compliance with the law, human rights, employee rights, as well as labor, environmental, quality and safety conditions), Desigual conducts audits which are carried out through an independent third-party entity, in accordance with the BSCI and SMETA international standards.

Along the years, the company has introduced sustainable fibers and launched collections featuring garments made from organic and recycled fibers, such as the "Love the World" collection released in January 2021.

In 2020, the brand accelerated its sustainability and corporate social responsibility (CSR) plan. With this plan enforced, 55% of Desigual’s garments are currently sustainable, a percentage that will increase to 70% for the 2023 spring-summer collection. The company also introduced a new ecofriendly labeling model that qualifies garments according to how much recycled or organic material they are made of.

In 2022, the company announced its aim to reduce its absolute GHG (greenhouse gas) emissions by 65% in 2026, compared to its 2019 rates. This initiative is part of the company's more challenging goal of reaching carbon neutrality by 2050. The company has also joined the Roadmap to Zero project of ZDHC (Zero Discharge of Hazardous Chemicals) to ensure best chemical  practices throughout the value chain, moving closer to the goal of zero discharges.

Regarding waste management, in 2021 the firm recovered 97% of the waste generated in its buildings and stores in Spain, around 1,100 tons. Overall, the company reduced waste generation by 20% compared to 2018. The goal of more sustainable packaging was achieved in 2021, when single-use plastic was removed from the packaging process.

Commercial network 
Desigual has stores and points of sale in 109 countries: with recent store openings in Asia (China, Japan, India), South Africa, Latin America (Colombia, Peru, Mexico, Guatemala, Ecuador), Europe (Italy), and ecommerce launching in Hong Kong, Russia and Turkey, among other markets. More precisely in Albania, Algeria, Andorra, Antigua and Barbuda, Armenia, Aruba, Australia, Austria, Azerbaijan, Bahrain, Belgium, Belarus, Bosnia and Herzegovina, Bermuda, Brazil, Brunei, Bulgaria, Canada, China, Colombia, Costa Rica, Chile, Croatia, Cyprus, Curaçao, Czech Republic, Ecuador, Estonia, El Salvador, Czech Republic, Denmark, Egypt, Russian Federation, United Arab Emirates, Finland, France, Germany, Mexico, Georgia, Gibraltar, Greece, Guadeloupe, Honduras, Hong Kong, Hungary, Iceland, India, Indonesia, Cayman Islands, Israel, Ireland, Italy, Japan, Jersey, Jordan, Kazakhstan, Kuwait, Latvia, Lebanon, Lithuania, Luxembourg, Macao, Macedonia, Malaysia, Malta, Montenegro, Morocco, Myanmar, Netherlands, New Zealand, Oman, Panama, Paraguay, Philippines, Poland, South Korea, Portugal, Puerto Rico, Qatar, Dominican Republic, Romania, Saudi Arabia, Singapore, Cuba, Spain, Serbia, Sri Lanka, South Africa, Switzerland, Sweden, Taiwan, Trinidad and Tobago, Tunisia, Turkey, Uruguay, Ukraine, United Kingdom, United States, Peru, Venezuela, Vietnam and Guatemala.

Disputes
In July 2008, the company Custo Barcelona, owned by designer Custo Dalmau, threatened to sue Desigual for systematically copying several of its products in an attempt to confuse customers, but the complaint never reached the courts. Within the textile industry, this was believed to be an advertising strategy of Custo’s to find new partners. Later that year, the firm Dolores Promesas filed a complaint against Desigual for copyright infringement after the company marketed a T-shirt with a design identical to one of its own. The complaint was settled out of court, with Desigual issuing a formal apology and withdrawing all garments with that design.

In 2014 the company received criticism for releasing a television commercial around Mother's Day which featured a woman poking a hole in a condom, displaying the words "You decide" on the screen. The company stated in its official Twitter profile that it was a humorous and fictional commercial, that included the warning text "do not try it at home".

See also
 Bonds (clothing)
 Gap Inc.
 H&M
 Zara (retailer)
 Calvin Klein
 List of companies of Spain
 European Retail Round Table

References

External links 

 
 Official Desigual blog
 Desigual Sustainability Platform

Clothing brands of Spain
Clothing companies of Spain
Companies based in Barcelona
Clothing companies established in 1984
Retail companies established in 1984
Spanish companies established in 1984
Clothing brands